Fernando Carvalho Ferreira Santana (born 13 December 1994 in Ribeirão Preto) is a Brazilian athlete specialising in the high jump. He represented his country at the 2017 World Championships narrowly missing the final. He also won two medals at the South American Championships. He competed at the 2020 Summer Olympics.

His personal bests are  outdoors (São Bernardo do Campo 2017) and  indoors (Nehvizdy 2020).

International competitions

References

External links

1994 births
Living people
Brazilian male high jumpers
Athletes (track and field) at the 2015 Pan American Games
Athletes (track and field) at the 2019 Pan American Games
Pan American Games athletes for Brazil
World Athletics Championships athletes for Brazil
Athletes (track and field) at the 2018 South American Games
South American Games silver medalists for Brazil
South American Games medalists in athletics
Athletes (track and field) at the 2020 Summer Olympics
Olympic athletes of Brazil
People from Ribeirão Preto
Sportspeople from São Paulo (state)
South American Championships in Athletics winners
21st-century Brazilian people